Wulfthryth (fl. 868) was a queen of Wessex, the wife of King Æthelred I.

Little is known of Wulfthryth. She witnessed a charter of 868, in which she has the title of regina ("queen"). The charter appears in the Codex Wintoniensis, but Wulfthryth is otherwise unrecorded in primary sources. Stephanie Hollis notes that 868 was the year of Alfred the Great's marriage to a Mercian and that "Wulfthryth's name looks Mercian".

Wulfthryth had two sons, Æthelhelm (c. 865 – c. 890) and Æthelwold (died 902), who were too young to succeed their father when he died in 871, and Alfred became king. Æthelwold unsuccessfully led Æthelwold's Revolt, disputing the throne with his cousin Edward the Elder after Alfred's death in 899.

Notes

External notes
 

9th-century English people
Anglo-Saxon royal consorts
House of Wessex
9th-century English women